Hilliard Donald Graves (born October 18, 1950) is a Canadian former professional ice hockey player who played 556 games in the National Hockey League.  He played for the California Golden Seals, Atlanta Flames, Vancouver Canucks, and Winnipeg Jets. During his career he was known for having a devastating hip check.

Career statistics

Regular season and playoffs

External links

1950 births
Atlanta Flames players
Baltimore Clippers players
California Golden Seals players
Canadian ice hockey right wingers
Ice hockey people from New Brunswick
Living people
New Brunswick Hawks players
Providence Reds players
Sportspeople from Saint John, New Brunswick
Tulsa Oilers (1964–1984) players
Undrafted National Hockey League players
Vancouver Canucks players
Winnipeg Jets (1979–1996) players
Canadian expatriate ice hockey players in the United States